The 1993 French Open was a tennis tournament that took place on the outdoor clay courts at the Stade Roland Garros in Paris, France. The tournament was held from 24 May until 6 June. It was the 97th staging of the French Open, and the second Grand Slam tennis event of 1993.

Seniors

Men's singles

 Sergi Bruguera defeated  Jim Courier, 6–4, 2–6, 6–2, 3–6, 6–3
It was Bruguera's 2nd title of the year, and his 8th overall. It was his 1st career Grand Slam title. Bruguera notably defeated the top two seeds (Pete Sampras and Courier) on his way to the title—the last male player to do so in any Grand Slam event until Stanislas Wawrinka did so at the 2014 Australian Open.

Women's singles

 Steffi Graf defeated  Mary Joe Fernández, 4–6, 6–2, 6–4 
It was Graf's 4th title of the year, and her 73rd overall. It was her 12th career Grand Slam title, and her 3rd French Open title.

Men's doubles

 Luke Jensen /  Murphy Jensen defeated  Marc-Kevin Goellner /  David Prinosil, 6–4, 6–7, 6–4

Women's doubles

 Gigi Fernández /  Natalia Zvereva defeated  Larisa Savchenko Neiland /  Jana Novotná, 6–3, 7–5

Mixed doubles

 Eugenia Maniokova /  Andrei Olhovskiy defeated  Elna Reinach /  Danie Visser, 6–2, 4–6, 6–4

Juniors

Boys' singles
 Roberto Carretero defeated  Albert Costa, 6–0, 7–6

Girls' singles
 Martina Hingis defeated  Laurence Courtois, 7–5, 7–5

Boys' doubles
 Steven Downs /  James Greenhalgh defeated  Neville Godwin /  Gareth Williams, 6–1, 6–1

Girls' doubles
 Laurence Courtois /  Nancy Feber defeated  Lara Bitter /  Maaike Koutstaal, 3–6, 6–1, 6–3

Prize money

Total prize money for the event was FF45,164,000.

References

External links
 French Open official website

 
1993 in French tennis
1993 in Paris